Purple Moonlight Pages is the sixth studio album by American rapper Rory Ferreira. It is the first studio album released under the moniker R.A.P. Ferreira. The album was produced by longtime collaborator Kenny Segal's group The Jefferson Park Boys, which features producers/multi-instrumentalists Aaron Carmack, Mike Parvizi, and Kenny Segal. Carmack handles most of the keys, live drums, and horns, Parvizi handles the bass, and Segal handles the beats and some keys. "Purple Moonlight Pages" has features from underground rapper Mike Ladd (who R.A.P. Ferreira has noted as an influence and frequently referenced on his project So the Flies Don't Come) and frequent collaborator Open Mike Eagle.

Style and artistry 
Purple Moonlight Pages is Ferreira's most consistent, focused venture into "jazz-rap." In contrast to the meandering, eclectic production and vocals of previous projects like Budding Ornithologists are Weary of Tired Analogies and So the Flies Don't Come, the album is composed largely of clean, expressive jazz instrumentals. While tracks like "CYCLES" and "OMENS AND TOTEMS" draw on Ferreira's signature abstract production, Purple Moonlight Pages as a whole represents an aesthetic commitment to jazz-rap.

Critical reception

Stephen Kearse of Pitchfork reviewed Purple Moonlight Pages as "his most free-spirited project yet."

Track listing

Personnel
Credits adapted from Bandcamp.

 Rob Araujo – piano 
 Aaron Carmack – Moog Opus 3 , live drums , keys , Rhodes , horns , programming 
 Daddy Kev – mastering
 Miles Doulas – Rhodes 
 The Jefferson Park Boys – production
 Alexander Kollman – artwork
 Mike Ladd – vocals 
 Open Mike Eagle – vocals 
 DJ Prolifix – scratches 
 Mike Parvizi – bass , Casio CZ101 , guitar 
 R.A.P. Ferreira – executive producer, vocals 
 Kenny Segal – executive producer, mixing, programming , additional production , Omnichord , MicroGranny 2 , Rhodes , drums , arrangement 
 Aaron Shaw – saxophone , flute 
 Thomas Tsuruda – programming 
 Jason Wool – Rhodes

References

External links
 

2020 albums
Milo (musician) albums